Vartiania sapho is a moth in the family Cossidae. It is found in Pakistan.

References

Natural History Museum Lepidoptera generic names catalog

Cossinae